Hazuki Genma (born 28 October 1998) is a Japanese professional footballer who plays as a midfielder for WE League club Omiya Ardija Ventus.

Club career 
Genma made her WE League debut on 12 September 2021.

References 

Living people
1998 births
Japanese women's footballers
Women's association football midfielders
Omiya Ardija Ventus players
WE League players
Association football people from Saitama Prefecture